Star of India is an iron-hulled sailing ship, built in 1863 in Ramsey, Isle of Man as the full-rigged ship Euterpe. After a career sailing from Great Britain to India and New Zealand, she was renamed, re-rigged as a barque, and became a salmon hauler on the Alaska to California route. Retired in 1926, she was restored as a seaworthy museum ship in 1962–3 and home-ported at the Maritime Museum of San Diego in San Diego, California. She is the oldest ship still sailing regularly and also the oldest iron-hulled merchant ship still afloat. The ship is both a California Historical Landmark and United States National Historic Landmark.

History

As Euterpe 
Named after Euterpe, the Greek muse of music, she was a full-rigged ship (a ship that is square-rigged on all three masts), built of iron in 1863 by Gibson, McDonald & Arnold, of Ramsey, Isle of Man, for the Indian jute trade of Wakefield Nash & Company of Liverpool.  She was launched on 14 November 1863, and assigned British Registration No.47617 and signal VPJK.

Euterpe's career had a rough beginning.  She sailed for Calcutta from Liverpool on 9 January 1864, under the command of Captain William John Storry. A collision with an unlit Spanish brig off the coast of Wales carried away the jib-boom and damaged other rigging. The crew became mutinous, refusing to continue, and she returned to Anglesey for repair; 17 of the crew were confined to the Beaumaris Gaol at hard labour. Then, in 1865, Euterpe was forced to cut away her masts in a gale in the Bay of Bengal off Madras and limped to Trincomalee and Calcutta for repair.  Captain Storry died during the return voyage to England and was buried at sea.

After her near-disastrous first two voyages Euterpe was sold, first in 1871 to David Brown of London for whom she made four more relatively uneventful voyages to India, then again (displaced by steamers after the opening of the Suez Canal) in 1871 to Shaw, Savill and Company of London (which in 1882 became the Shaw, Savill & Albion Line).  In late 1871 she began 25 years of carrying passengers and freight in the New Zealand emigrant trade, each voyage going eastward around the world before returning to England.  The fastest of her 21 passages to New Zealand took 100 days, the longest 143 days.  She also made ports of call in Australia, California, and Chile.  A baby was born on one of those trips en route to New Zealand, and was given the middle name Euterpe. Another child, John William Philips Palmer, was born on the 1873 journey to Dunedin, New Zealand, and was partially named after the captain Theo E. Philips ("Born Lo 42.30 south La 0.30 west at 11 am Feb 21").

In 1897, after 21 round-the-world trips, Euterpe was sold, first to Hawaiian owners, then in 1899 to the Pacific Colonial Ship Company of San Francisco, California and from 1898 to 1901 made four voyages between the Pacific Northwest, Australia and Hawaii carrying primarily lumber, coal and sugar. She was registered in the United States on 30 October 1900.

As Star of India 

In 1901, Euterpe was sold to the Alaska Packers' Association of San Francisco, who re-rigged her as a barque (converting the square-rigged aftermost mast to fore-and-aft) and in 1902 began carrying fishermen, cannery workers, coal and canning supplies each spring from Oakland, California to Nushagak in the Bering Sea, returning each autumn with holds full of canned salmon.  In 1906, the Association changed her name to be consistent with the rest of their fleet, and she became Star of India. She was laid up in 1923 after 22 Alaskan voyages; by that time, steam ruled the seas.

In 1926, Star of India was sold to the Zoological Society of San Diego, California, to be the centrepiece of a planned museum and aquarium.  The Great Depression and World War II caused that plan to be cancelled, and it was not until 1957 that restoration began.  Alan Villiers, a windjammer captain and author, came to San Diego on a lecture tour.  Seeing Star of India decaying in the harbour, he publicised the situation and inspired a group of citizens to form the "Star of India Auxiliary" in 1959 to support the restoration of the ship.  Progress was still slow, but in 1976, Star of India finally put to sea again. She houses exhibits for the Maritime Museum of San Diego, is kept fully seaworthy, and sails at least once a year. With the many other ships now in the Museum, she hosts frequent tour guide-led school tours for over 6,000 children a year, as well as a Living History Programme in which students "step back in time" and are immersed in history and teamwork activities during overnight visits.

The 1863  Star of India is the fourth oldest ship afloat in the United States, after the 1797  , the 1841 Charles W. Morgan, and 1854 , and is the oldest ship in the world that still sails regularly. Unlike many preserved or restored vessels, her hull, cabins and equipment are nearly 100% original.

Home port 

Star of India is docked at the San Diego Maritime Museum, just south of Lindbergh Field (San Diego International Airport), on the west side of North Harbor Drive at approximately Ash Street – all within the Port of San Diego tidelands. This location is slightly west of downtown San Diego, California. The other ships belonging to the Maritime Museum are always docked to the north of Star of India. HMS Rose), a replica of a British frigate.

When she sails, Star of India often remains within sight of the coast of San Diego County, and usually returns to her dock within a day. She is sailed by a skilled volunteer crew of Maritime Museum members, who train all year. She has become one of the landmark ships in San Diego's harbor.

In August – September 2009, Star of India was removed from display to a local drydock facility for a required Coast Guard inspection and various maintenance below the waterline, at a cost of approximately $225,000, and 3–4 weeks off display.
Her last voyage was on 18 November 2018.

The next time she is scheduled to sail is November 2023, in celebration of her 160th birthday.

Appearances in media 
The Star of India has appeared in episodes of:
 Dirty Jobs Season Four, Episode 89, "Tar Rigger"
 Ghost Hunters Season Four, Episode 426, "Spirits on the Water".
 Great Ships episode "The Windjammers".
 Haunted History Season One, Episode 3, "Haunted Ships"
 At the 2013 San Diego Comic-Con, Ubisoft used the ship to promote their new game Assassin's Creed IV: Black Flag and renamed the ship for 3 days after the in-game ship The Jackdaw.
 Ghost Adventures Season 12, Episode 6 "Star of India"
 There Goes a Boat, episode 7 of the Real Wheels children's series.

References

Citations

Bibliography
Star of India: The Log of an Iron Ship by Jerry MacMullen (1979, Maritime Museum Association of San Diego)  (pbk, first printed 1961)
Euterpe: Diaries, Letters and Logs of the "Star of India" as a British Emigrant Ship by Craig Arnold (1988, Maritime Museum Association of San Diego)  (pbk)

External links

 Star of India from Maritime Museum of San Diego
 Star of India from San Diego Ghosts - several pictures of the ship - inside views
 Star of India from Golden State Images - more ship views
 Euterpe from Through Mighty Seas

Maritime Museum of San Diego
Barques
Windjammers
Museum ships in San Diego
Ships of the United States
Individual sailing vessels
Tall ships of the United Kingdom
Tall ships of the United States
Sail training ships
National Historic Landmarks in California
Victorian-era passenger ships of the United Kingdom
Ships on the National Register of Historic Places in California
National Register of Historic Places in San Diego
1863 ships
Ships built in the Isle of Man